Puisand Lai (born July 29, 2000) is a Canadian wheelchair tennis and 1.0 point wheelchair basketball player. In 2018, she was part of the Canadian national women's wheelchair basketball team at the 2018 Wheelchair Basketball World Championship in Hamburg.

Biography 
Puisand Lai was born in Honolulu County, Hawaii, on July 29, 2000. When she was six years old, she was diagnosed with transverse myelitis, a rare neurological condition in which the spinal cord is inflamed.

In October 2013, Lai joined the Mississauga Little Aces program, a project supported by Tennis Canada and run by Albert Fong of Mississagua Little Aces, which teaches tennis to children from ages six to sixteen, and children with disabilities from ages eight to nineteen. Lai was soon able to play with non-disabled children.

In July 2014, she  represented Tennis Canada in the International Tennis Federation Americas Junior Wheelchair Tennis Camp, one of only three such camps worldwide. By 2017, she was ranked 7th in the ITF rankings for girls' wheelchair tennis, and 73rd in the women's. She was a member of Canada's 2017 World Team Cup junior team, competing in Sardinia, Italy after the team earned a wild card spot from the International Tennis Federation.

Lai also participated in sledge hockey, sailing and wheelchair basketball, where she was classified as a 1.0 point player, and began playing competitively in 2014. She was noticed by Kathy Ludwig, the Ontario coach, who asked her to join Team Ontario. In 2018, she was part of the Canadian national women's wheelchair basketball team at the 2018 Wheelchair Basketball World Championship in Hamburg.

, she is studying engineering at McMaster University.

Notes

2000 births
Canadian women's wheelchair basketball players
Living people
Paralympic wheelchair basketball players of Canada
Sportspeople from Honolulu
American emigrants to Canada